Atkinsonville is an unincorporated community in Morgan Township, Owen County, in the U.S. state of Indiana.

History
Atkinsonville was platted in 1850, and named for its founder, Stephen Atkinson. A post office was established at Atkinsonville in 1854, and remained in operation until it was discontinued in 1907.

Geography

References

Unincorporated communities in Owen County, Indiana
Unincorporated communities in Indiana